Kentish Town Lock is a lock on the Regent's Canal in Kentish Town, in the London Borough of Camden.

The nearest London Underground station is Camden Town on the Northern line.

The nearest London Overground station is Camden Road

See also

Canals of the United Kingdom
History of the British canal system

References

Locks on the Regent's Canal
Geography of the London Borough of Camden
Buildings and structures in the London Borough of Camden